Independence is an unincorporated community in New Independence Township, Saint Louis County, Minnesota, United States.

The community is located 22 miles northwest of the city of Duluth at the junction of U.S. Highway 53 and State Highway 33 (MN 33). Saint Louis County Highway 47 (CR 47) is also in the vicinity. Independence is located 17 miles north of the city of Cloquet.

The Cloquet River flows through the area. The community of Culver is nearby.

Local business establishments include the Wayside Corner Store Spur.

References

 Rand McNally Road Atlas – 2007 edition – Minnesota entry
 Official State of Minnesota Highway Map – 2011/2012 edition

Unincorporated communities in Minnesota
Unincorporated communities in St. Louis County, Minnesota